William George Broome (18 March 1910 - 1988) was a British-Indian civil servant and judge. He was an Indian Civil Service officer of the 1932 batch.

Education

He was educated at Latymer Upper School, Hammersmith. He continued his further studies at Gonville and Caius College, Cambridge. Finally, he joined the Indian Civil Service on 10.10.1932.

Life 

Justice William Broome (ICS 1932), a district and sessions judge at the time of Independence in 1947, remained in Indian government service as a judge. Having married an Indian, Swarup Kumari Gaur (the daughter of Hari Singh Gour), in 1937, with whom he raised a family, he eventually renounced his British citizenship in 1958 and became an Indian citizen with the personal intervention of Prime Minister Jawaharlal Nehru, himself a former barrister who regarded Broome as a distinguished jurist and as "much as Indian as anybody can be who is not born in India". Upon his retirement on 18 March 1972 from the Allahabad High Court as its seniormost puisne judge, Broome was the last former ICS officer of European origin serving in India.

He died in Bangalore in 1988.

Family 

He had a son Ashok Broome and three daughters- Maya Nair, Lakshmi Seth and Indira Chaudhary .

Career 

He served in Uttar Pradesh as Assistant Magistrate and Collector. He then became District and Session Judge on 16.4.1941. He was also appointed as Registrar of Allahabad High Court in December, 1943. He was confirmed as District and Sessions Judge on 13 September 1945.

He heard the early hearings of the landmark Indian court case, State of Uttar Pradesh v. Raj Narain.

Allahabad High Court 

He was appointed Additional Judge of Allahabad High Court on 08.12.1958. He was then made the permanent Judge of Allahabad High Court on 18.2.1959.

References

External links
 Allahabad High Court

1910 births
1988 deaths
People from London
Alumni of Gonville and Caius College, Cambridge